Sereyan (also Romanized as Sereyān, Saryān, and Seryān; also known as Sīdān, Sīreyān, Sīrian, and Sīrīān) is a village in Emamzadeh Abdol Aziz Rural District, Jolgeh District, Isfahan County, Isfahan Province, Iran. At the 2006 census, its population was 214, in 63 families.

References 

Populated places in Isfahan County